This is a list of chapters for Yu-Gi-Oh! Arc-V and Yu-Gi-Oh! Arc-V: Saikyō Duelist Yuya!!, two Yu-Gi-Oh! manga spin-off titles, adapting Yu-Gi-Oh! Arc-V anime. Yu-Gi-Oh! Arc-V is written by Shin Yoshida and illustrated by Naohito Miyoshi. It was published by Shueisha and serialized by V-Jump from August 21, 2015 to April 19, 2019. Yu-Gi-Oh! Arc-V Saikyō Duelist Yuya!! is written by Akihiro Tomonaga. It was published by Shueisha and serialized by Saikyō Jump from April 3, 2015 to August 3, 2017.

Yu-Gi-Oh! Arc-V

Saikyō Duelist Yuya

References

Yu-Gi-Oh! Arc-V
Arc-V